Roberto Landi (born 2 January 1956) is an Italian football manager and former player.

Playing career
Landi was born in Forlì. A goalkeeper, he joined the Piacenza youth system in 1966 and later joined the first team, then playing in Serie C1  division. He later moved to Modena as second-choice goalkeeper, and then played also for Ravenna and Siena, before to leave Italy to join the North American Soccer League in 1979, at the age of 23. During his North American time, he played for Vancouver Whitecaps and Chicago Sting, before signing for South African side Kaizer Chiefs, and returning in the United States with New York Cosmos in 1983. He then returned in Italy and played for a number of amateur sides before retiring at the age of 30.

Coaching career
Landi served as goalkeeping coach for the United States national team during their 1990 and 1994 FIFA World Cup campaigns. From 1992 to 1995 he served as head coach of Italian amateur team Marignano. In 1998, he became head coach of the Georgia U21 national team, and later filled the same position for the Lithuania U21 in 2001. He obtained a UEFA Pro License in 2003, and was part of Messina managing staff in their 2002–03 campaign.

In January 2005 he became head coach of National Bucharest, where he achieved a record 17 wins in a row. He left the post in September 2005, citing personal reasons, later being appointed as Qatar U21 head coach. He then briefly moved in Hungary, serving as FC Sopron head for three matches in the 2006–07 season before being sacked for losing their local derby to Győr.

In October 2007 he was linked with the managing position at Port Vale F.C. through his agent Bryan Yeubrey.

In June 2008 Landi was linked with Scottish First Division side Livingston He was appointed manager of the club on 11 June, August 2008 best coach of the month.

In June 2009, he was unveiled as new head coach of Royale Union Saint-Gilloise. He was however dismissed later in December due to money problems with the club.

He was hired in January 2011 to be the Liberia national team, but was sacked in February 2012. He was linked to the position again in May 2014.

Managerial statistics

References

External links
 Roberto Landi Interview
 Roberto Landi, globetrotter coach: 'Serie A does not consider Italian technicians abroad!'

1956 births
Living people
People from Forlì
Sportspeople from the Province of Forlì-Cesena
Italian footballers
Footballers from Emilia-Romagna
Association football goalkeepers
Piacenza Calcio 1919 players
Ravenna F.C. players
Modena F.C. players
A.C.N. Siena 1904 players
Vancouver Whitecaps (1974–1984) players
Chicago Sting (NASL) players
Kaizer Chiefs F.C. players
New York Cosmos players
Italian football managers
Scottish Football League managers
FC Progresul București managers
FC Sopron managers
Livingston F.C. managers
Royale Union Saint-Gilloise managers
Liberia national football team managers
Italian expatriate footballers
Italian expatriate football managers
Italian expatriate sportspeople in the United States
Expatriate soccer players in the United States
Italian expatriate sportspeople in South Africa
Expatriate soccer players in South Africa
Italian expatriate sportspeople in Georgia (country)
Expatriate football managers in Georgia (country)
Italian expatriate sportspeople in Lithuania
Expatriate football managers in Lithuania
Italian expatriate sportspeople in Romania
Expatriate football managers in Romania
Italian expatriate sportspeople in Qatar
Expatriate football managers in Qatar
Italian expatriate sportspeople in Hungary
Expatriate football managers in Hungary
Italian expatriate sportspeople in Scotland
Expatriate football managers in Scotland
Italian expatriate sportspeople in Belgium
Expatriate football managers in Belgium
Italian expatriate sportspeople in Liberia
Expatriate football managers in Liberia
Italian expatriate sportspeople in Libya
Expatriate football managers in Libya